Adesh Chauhan is an Indian politician and member of the Bharatiya Janata Party. He is the member of the Uttarakhand Legislative Assembly from the BHEL Ranipur constituency in Haridwar district. He first competed in Legislative election in 2012 from Ranipur constituency. He was elected once again in 2017 for a second time in a row.

References 

People from Haridwar
Bharatiya Janata Party politicians from Uttarakhand
Uttarakhand MLAs 2022–2027
Living people
Uttarakhand MLAs 2017–2022
Year of birth missing (living people)